Great Plains State Park is a  Oklahoma state park located in Kiowa County, Oklahoma. The part of the park that is developed for campers and hikers is about 487 acres. However, the entire park encompasses more than 1,200 acres from one end to the other. It is located near the city of Mountain Park, Oklahoma. Located south of Hobart off Hwy 183, Great Plains State Park is nestled between the Wichita Mountains and the Tom Steed Reservoir. The area offers water sports, boating, boat ramps, camping, RV parking, swimming beach, playground, picnic areas, cycling, mountain biking and hiking trails. RV sites consist of 14 modern water, sewer, and electric sites and 42 semi-modern sites with water and electric.

Fees
To help fund a backlog of deferred maintenance and park improvements, the state implemented an entrance fee for this park and 21 others effective June 15, 2020.  The fees, charged per vehicle, start at $10 per day for a single-day or $8 for residents with an Oklahoma license plate or Oklahoma tribal plate.  Fees are waived for honorably discharged veterans and Oklahoma residents age 62 & older and their spouses.  Passes good for three days or a week are also available; annual passes good at all 22 state parks charging fees are offered at a cost of $75 for out-of-state visitors or $60 for Oklahoma residents.  The 22 parks are:
 Arrowhead Area at Lake Eufaula State Park
 Beavers Bend State Park
 Boiling Springs State Park
 Cherokee Landing State Park
 Fort Cobb State Park
 Foss State Park
 Honey Creek Area at Grand Lake State Park
 Great Plains State Park
 Great Salt Plains State Park
 Greenleaf State Park
 Keystone State Park
 Lake Eufaula State Park
 Lake Murray State Park
 Lake Texoma State Park
 Lake Thunderbird State Park
 Lake Wister State Park
 Natural Falls State Park
 Osage Hills State Park
 Robbers Cave State Park
 Sequoyah State Park
 Tenkiller State Park
 Twin Bridges Area at Grand Lake State Park

Notes

References

See also
 Tom Steed Reservoir

State parks of Oklahoma
Protected areas of Kiowa County, Oklahoma